The bronze loquat (Eriobotrya deflexa) is a tree native to Guangdong, Hainan, Taiwan, and South Vietnam.

Coppertone loquat
The Coppertone loquat (Eriobotrya 'Coppertone') is a hybrid of Eriobotrya deflexa and Indian hawthorn (Rhaphiolepis indica) and is a popular shrub in the Southern United States and California.

References

deflexa